Ieropigi (before 1927: Κοστενέτσι - Kostenetsi) is a village in Kastoria Regional Unit, Macedonia, Greece.

The Greek census (1920) recorded 563 people in the village. Following the Greek-Turkish population exchange, in 1926 within Kostenetsi there were 11 refugee families from Pontus. The Greek census (1991) recorded 501 village inhabitants. There were 12 refugee families (53 people) in 1928. 

By the 1950s, the Greek government assisted a group of nomadic transhumant Aromanians to settle in depopulated villages of the area like Ieropigi. Aromanians are now the only inhabitants of the village.

References

Populated places in Kastoria (regional unit)
Aromanian settlements in Greece